"Wake Me Up" is a song by Japanese singer songwriter Mai Kuraki, taken from her third compilation album Mai Kuraki Best 151A: Love & Hope (2014). It was released on February 26, 2014 digitally and as a Video single by Northern Music. The song was served as the theme song to the 2014 Japanese film Kiki's Delivery Service.

Commercial performance
"Wake Me Up" debuted at number 2 on the Oricon Weekly DVD Chart and number 75 on the Japan Hot 100.

Music video
A short version of the official music video was first released on Kuraki's official YouTube account on 25 February 2014. As of January 2018, it has received over 318,000 views on YouTube.

Track listing

Charts

Weekly charts

Certification and sales

|-
! scope="row"| Japan (RIAJ)
| 
| 12,384
|}

Release history

References

2014 singles
Mai Kuraki songs
Songs written by Mai Kuraki
2014 songs
Songs with music by Akihito Tokunaga
Song recordings produced by Daiko Nagato